Jair Braga (3 June 1954 – 5 March 2004) was a Brazilian cyclist. He competed in the team time trial event at the 1984 Summer Olympics.

References

External links
 

1954 births
2004 deaths
Brazilian male cyclists
Brazilian road racing cyclists
Olympic cyclists of Brazil
Cyclists at the 1984 Summer Olympics